James William Byers (October 3, 1877 – September 8, 1948) was a catcher in Major League Baseball. He played for the St. Louis Cardinals in 1904.

References

External links

1877 births
1948 deaths
Major League Baseball catchers
St. Louis Cardinals players
Baseball players from Indiana
Minor league baseball managers
Logansport Ottos players
Dayton Old Soldiers players
New Orleans Pelicans (baseball) players
Newark Colts players
Paterson Giants players
Bristol Bell Makers players
Jersey City Skeeters players
Philadelphia Athletics (minor league) players
Harrisburg Ponies players
Syracuse Stars (minor league baseball) players
Portsmouth Boers players
Indianapolis Hoosiers (minor league) players
Marion Glass Blowers players
Minneapolis Millers (baseball) players
Seattle Siwashes players
Baltimore Orioles (IL) players